Bishop Hill may refer to:

Bishop Hill, Illinois, a village in Henry County
Bishop Hill State Historic Site, Illinois, site of the former 
Bishop Hill Colony, a 19th-century religious commune
Bishop Hills, Texas, a small town near Amarillo, Texas
Bishop Hill, a hill in the Lomond Hills in Perth and Kinross, Scotland
Bishop Hill, another name of Woh Chai Shan, a hill in Shek Kip Mei, Hong Kong
Bishop's Hill Wood, Wickwar, South Gloucestershire UK
A global warming blog by Andrew Montford

See also
Bishophill, an area of York in England